Maguilaura Dessire Frias Pomiano (born May 28, 1997) is a peruvian volleyball player who plays for the Peru national team. Maguilaura was part of the team that won gold at the 2012 Youth South American Championship, the first gold medal for Peruvian volleyball in that category after 32 years and the first gold in any category in 19 years. She was born in Lima.

Career
Frias was transferred from Sporting Cristal to Universidad San Martin for the 2015/16 season.
 She won the silver medal in the 2017 Bolivarian Games under 23 tournament.

Clubs
  Sporting Cristal (2011–2014)
  Universidad San Martin (2015–2020)
  Turkuaz Seramik OSB Teknik Koleji Gençlik (2020 - 2021)
  CAV Esquimo Dos Hermanas (2021 - )

Awards

Individuals
 2013–14 Liga Nacional Superior de Voleibol "Best Spiker"
 2013–14 Liga Nacional Superior de Voleibol "Best Opposite"
 2014 Junior South American Championship "Best Opposite"
 [[2014–15 Liga Nacional Superior de Voleibol Femenino|2014–15 Liga Nacional Superior de Voleibol Femenino  "Best Opposite"]] 2015 Copa Latina U20 "Best Outside Spiker" 2015 Copa Latina U20 "Best Receiver"''

National team
 2013 Bolivarian Games –  Gold Medal

Junior team
 2011 U16 South American Championship –  Silver Medal
 2012 Junior South American Championship –  Silver Medal
 2012 Youth South American Championship –  Gold Medal
 2014 Junior South American Championship –  Silver Medal
 2014 Junior Final Four Cup –  Gold Medal

References

1997 births
Living people
Peruvian women's volleyball players
Sportspeople from Lima
Volleyball players at the 2015 Pan American Games
Pan American Games competitors for Peru
21st-century Peruvian women